John McEnroe was the defending champion, but did not participate this year.

Ivan Lendl won the tournament, beating Scott Davis in the final, 3–6, 6–3, 6–4.

Seeds

  Ivan Lendl (champion)
  Jimmy Connors (semifinals)
  Andrés Gómez (quarterfinals)
  Vitas Gerulaitis (second round)
  Eliot Teltscher (quarterfinals)
  Henri Leconte (first round)
  Hank Pfister (second round)
  Steve Denton (first round)

Draw

Finals

Top half

Bottom half

External links
 Main draw

1983 Grand Prix (tennis)
Tokyo Indoor